Bonsucro is the leading global sustainability platform and standard for sugar cane, one of the world's most important crops. Established in 2008, it's a global non-profit, multi-stakeholder governance group promoting sustainable sugar cane, including production, processing and trade around the world.

Their Statement of Purpose is to "collectively accelerate the sustainable production and uses of sugarcane". Unlike other sustainability initiatives, Bonsucro focuses exclusively on sugarcane, its products and derivatives including sugar, ethanol, molasses and bagasse. They are ISEAL Code Compliant, having been independently evaluated against the ISEAL Codes of Good Practice - a globally-recognised framework for effective, credible, sustainability systems.

Bonsucro has a strong local presence in the countries that produce, use and consume the most sugarcane and its products. Offices can be found in the United Kingdom (London) and Brazil (Ribeirão Preto), with staff also based in India and Mexico. 

Both Bonsucro and the standards set by the Roundtable on Sustainable Biomaterials have been noted as in practise expanding the EU RED guidelines to include other factors, such as land tenure issues as prescribed by national law.

Statistics 
Since 2011, Bonsucro has certified over 800 millions tonnes of sugarcane, and over 55 million tonnes of sugar.

In 2021, the number of certified mills rose to 145. Certified mills were found to have reduced their water use by 53 % after five years of certification. 71 % of certified mills produced enough energy to export to the national grid. 

Through ongoing certification, producers demonstrate the ability to reduce their nitrogen fertiliser use per hectare, from an average of 81 kg N/ha at initial certification to an average of 67 kg N/ha after five years. In 2020, certified producers used an average of 3.5kg active ingredient/ha for both pesticides and herbicides - well within the standard threshold of using less than 5 kg active ingredient per hectare.

Through Bonsucro membership and certification, over 32,000 seasonal workers in sugarcane production and processing now have proper contracts and are paid at least the national minimum wage. 182,800 workers are covered by health and safety plans and have access to first aid.

All figures have been taken from Bonsucro's 2021 Outcome Report.

Bonsucro Strategic Plan 2021-2026: Changing for Good 
In 2021 Bonsucro announced its new five-year strategic plan. The defining Statement of Purpose is "to collectively accelerate the sustainable production and uses of sugarcane". 

Its three Strategic Aims are:

 Improve the environmental impact of sugarcane – through driving climate action, lowering emissions, improving water security and stewardship, and improving biodiversity and soil health
 Strengthen decent work and respect for human rights in sugarcane farming and milling – through increasing wages in farming and milling, and improve occupational health and safety
 Create value across the supply chain – through increasing supply and demand of certified, sustainable sugar, ethanol and derivatives, and making the value chain more inclusive and sustainable

The three strategic aims correspond to the three pillars of sustainable development and define how Bonsucro will contribute to the UN’s 2030 Sustainable Development Goals.

Bonsucro works with its member to address critical challenges across the sugarcane sector. Members include farmers, millers, traders, and end users.

Bonsucro Certification 
There are two types of Bonsucro certification that allow stakeholders to demonstrate their commitment to environmental and social sustainability in sugarcane. Stakeholders are audited by third parties in order to ensure impartiality and fairness.

The Production Standard 
The Production Standard helps farmers and mills to measure key environmental and social impacts. It is designed to help businesses increase efficiency whilst also reducing their waste, energy and water use. 

It has five core principles:

 Assess and manage environmental, social and human rights risks
 Respect labour rights and occupational safety and health standards
 Manage input, production and processing efficiencies to enhance sustainability
 Actively manage biodiversity and ecosystem services
 Continuously improve other key areas of the business

The Chain of Custody Standard 
The Chain of Custody Standard enables brands to trace sugarcane from the origin to the end product. It provides proof to buyers that they are sourcing and trading responsibly, allowing them to make on-product claims.

The main principles are:

 Implement a Mass Balance Chain of Custody
 Validate Bonsucro data
 Reconcile Bonsucro data
 Trace Bonsucro Data
 Identify data to clients

Bonsucro Membership 
Bonsucro has over 300 members from 55 countries, all committed to making the sugarcane sector more sustainable. 

Benefits of membership include:

 Use of the Credit Trading Platform
 Technical advice on sustainability in production and supply chains
 Practical tools and resources
 Dedicated membership management

Other Mentions 
EU market access has been labeled as important by Colombian policy-makers, and described as driving the country's national policy aiming for 40% Bonsucro sugarcane. However, this use of certification in the context of biofuels has caused concern regarding the consequences of intensification in Colombia, although as of November 2014 no mills had yet achieved certification in the country.  The first Bonsucro certified ethanol fuel, from Brazil, was first imported into Europe through the Port of Rotterdam in 2012.

References

Nature conservation organisations based in the United Kingdom
Sugar organizations
Product certification
Environmental certification
2008 establishments in England
Agricultural organisations based in the United Kingdom
Environmental organizations established in 2008